Chris Smart (born 17 October 1958) is an Australian cricketer. He played in twenty-two first-class and three List A matches for Queensland between 1982 and 1990.

See also
 List of Queensland first-class cricketers

References

External links
 

1958 births
Living people
Australian cricketers
Queensland cricketers
People from the National Capital District (Papua New Guinea)